Jørgen Arenholt (14 December 1876 – 27 July 1953) was a Danish tennis player and medical doctor. He competed in two events at the 1912 Summer Olympics.

He was married to Julie Arenholt née Rosengreen (10 December 1873 – 21 July 1952) a Danish civil engineer, women's rights activist and politician.

References

External links
 

1876 births
1953 deaths
Danish male tennis players
Olympic tennis players of Denmark
Tennis players at the 1912 Summer Olympics
Sportspeople from Copenhagen
20th-century Danish people